Walter Harold Covert (September 13, 1865 – May 13, 1949), was a corporate lawyer based in Nova Scotia, influential member of the Conservative Party, and served as the 16th Lieutenant Governor of Nova Scotia from 1931 to 1937.

As well as head of a large Halifax law firm, Covert served as president of Nova Scotia Light and Power.

He was the uncle and father-in-law of Frank Manning Covert.

References

1865 births
1949 deaths
Lieutenant Governors of Nova Scotia
Lawyers in Nova Scotia